Aleksandr Aleksandrovich Marchenko (born 3 February 1996) is a Russian football player. He plays for FC Sakhalinets Moscow.

Club career
He made his debut in the Russian Professional Football League for FC Krasnodar-2 on 12 July 2013 in a game against FC Chernomorets Novorossiysk.

He made his debut for the senior squad of FC Krasnodar on 30 October 2013 in a Russian Cup game against FSC Dolgoprudny.

He made his Russian Football National League debut for PFC Spartak Nalchik on 6 August 2016 in a game against FC Yenisey Krasnoyarsk.

References

1996 births
People from Timashyovsky District
Sportspeople from Krasnodar Krai
Living people
Russian footballers
Russia youth international footballers
Association football defenders
FC Krasnodar players
FC Krasnodar-2 players
FC Chernomorets Novorossiysk players
PFC Spartak Nalchik players
FC Luch Vladivostok players
FC Zenit-Izhevsk players
Russian First League players
Russian Second League players